Daniel Burros (March 5, 1937 – October 31, 1965) was a Jewish American who was a former member of the American Nazi Party. Later, after a falling-out with founder George Lincoln Rockwell, Burros became a Kleagle, or recruiter, for the New York State branch of the United Klans of America, the most violent Klan group of the time.

Burros killed himself on October 31, 1965, hours after his Jewish heritage was made public, shooting himself in the chest and then the head. At the time, he was reportedly listening to music composed by Richard Wagner.

Early life

Daniel Burros was born to Jewish parents George and Esther Sunshine Burros in the Bronx.  The family moved to Queens a few years later and Burros attended Hebrew school at Talmud Torah in Richmond Hill, where his bar mitzvah was held in 1950.

Military service
Burros expressed a desire to enter the United States Military Academy at West Point (which never came to fruition). However, he enlisted in the National Guard while still in high school and wore his uniform to class on drill days. He enlisted in the United States Army in 1955, but he was later discharged after a series of suicide attempts involving the ingestion of large amounts of aspirin and non-fatal cuts on his wrists. He praised Adolf Hitler in a suicide note. His discharge was ascribed to "reasons of unsuitability, character, and behavior disorder".

Political activity
Burros eventually joined the American Nazi Party. He was an editor of the party's newsletter, Stormtrooper. Burros's Jewish heritage had been suspected by a number of fellow American Nazi Party members. Many of Rockwell's stormtroopers distrusted Burros not only for being Jewish, but also a self-hating Jew, and for his bizarre behavior. Burros would sometimes bring a knish to the American Nazi Party headquarters and make such statements as "Let's eat this good Jew food!" Burros also frequently spent time with Jewish women. In one incident, described in William H. Schmaltz' 1999 book, Hate: George Lincoln Rockwell and the American Nazi Party, Burros once publicly described a lurid fantasy in which the keys of a piano were modified to deliver electric shocks via wires attached to the Jewish victim of their choice. He believed that the combination of music from the piano and the electric shocks would cause them to convulse in rhythm to the piano and provide entertainment. Another example is the fact that he owned a bar of soap wrapped in paper with the words "made from the finest Jewish fat" imprinted on it. According to the writer Martin Lee, "a former Nazi associate claimed that Burros enjoyed torturing dogs, including his own pet, Gas Chambers".

Suicide
Burros's Jewish background was made public in a New York Times article written by reporter John McCandlish Phillips. Phillips initially tried to reach out to Burros by bringing up statements which indicated that he felt trapped in the racist movement. However, his attempts were unsuccessful. Not long after the Times issue with the startling revelations of his Jewish heritage went on sale, Burros died by suicide in the residence of his friend and fellow Klansman Roy Frankhouser in Reading, Pennsylvania.

In a press conference, a morose George Lincoln Rockwell praised Burros's dedication. He took the opportunity to rail against Jews, whom he referred to as "a unique people with a distinct mass of mental disorders" and ascribed Burros's instability and suicide to "this unfortunate Jewish psychosis". Despite the fact that Burros was a Jew and distrusted by his stormtroopers, Rockwell had wished to maintain at least a working relationship with him.

Analysis of being a Jewish Nazi
Burros is sometimes cited as an example of a self-hating Jew. He was also influenced by Francis Parker Yockey's Imperium.

The story of Dan Burros was also loosely adapted into Henry Bean's 2001 film The Believer. It also inspired the fifth episode of the first season of the TV series Lou Grant, titled "Nazi", which aired on October 18, 1977, and the season 5 episode of Cold Case titled "Spiders".

References

 One More Victim: The Life and Death of an American-Jewish Nazi by A. M. Rosenthal and Arthur Gelb (New American Library, 1967)
 Henry Bean, The Believer: Confronting Jewish Self-Hatred. New York: Thunder's Mouth Press, 2002. .

External links
 Photograph of Dan Burros from the Detroit Free Press
 "Old Smoke: The Death of Daniel Burros: A Jewish Klansman who did more than just hate himself." by William Bryk in New York Press
 DAN BURROS: Reasons to Believe, by Joel Lewis, NY Press
 "Hate and Hypocrisy" Intelligence Report from the Southern Poverty Law Center

1937 births
1965 suicides
Jewish American military personnel
American Nazi Party members
Jewish-American history
John Adams High School (Queens) alumni
American Ku Klux Klan members
People from Queens, New York
Suicides by firearm in Pennsylvania
20th-century American Jews
1965 deaths
Multiple gunshot suicides
Neo-Nazis of Jewish descent